is a Japanese football player. He currently plays for Giravanz Kitakyushu.

Career statistics
Updated to 23 February 2020.

References

External links

Profile at Giravanz Kitakyushu

1987 births
Living people
Takushoku University alumni
Association football people from Kanagawa Prefecture
Japanese footballers
J2 League players
J3 League players
Japan Football League players
Tochigi SC players
V-Varen Nagasaki players
Giravanz Kitakyushu players
Tegevajaro Miyazaki players
Association football midfielders